Federico Heinz is an Argentinian programmer and Free Software advocate living in London. He is a co-founder and former president of Fundación Vía Libre, a non-profit organization that promotes the free flow of knowledge as a motor for social progress, and the use and development of Free Software. He has helped legislators such an Argentina's Ing. Dragan, Dr. Conde, and Peru's Dr. Villanueva draft and defend legislation demanding the use of Free Software in all areas of public administration.

He works at Google in their UK office.

He speaks fluent Spanish, English, and German.

References

External links
 A video of Heinz on a panel about public administration
 Recordings of two talks by Heinz from a Dublin event, April 29th 2006
 Personal blog 

Copyright activists
Free software people
Free software programmers
Linux people
Year of birth missing (living people)
Living people